Laurent Giammartini (born 2 February 1967) is a French wheelchair tennis player. At the 1992 Summer Paralympics held in Barcelona, Spain, he won the silver medal in the men's doubles event together with Thierry Caillier and the bronze medal in the men's singles event. He also represented France at the 1988, 1996 and 2000 Summer Paralympics. He did not win a medal at these events.

He won the ITF World Champion award in men's wheelchair tennis in 1992 and 1994.

In 1995, he won the men's singles event at the Wheelchair Tennis Masters held in Eindhoven, Netherlands. In 1996 and 1998 he finished in second place in this event.

References

External links 
 
 

1967 births
Living people
Paralympic wheelchair tennis players of France
Wheelchair tennis players at the 1988 Summer Paralympics
Wheelchair tennis players at the 1992 Summer Paralympics
Wheelchair tennis players at the 1996 Summer Paralympics
Wheelchair tennis players at the 2000 Summer Paralympics
Medalists at the 1992 Summer Paralympics
Paralympic silver medalists for France
Paralympic bronze medalists for France
Paralympic medalists in wheelchair tennis
Tennis players from Paris
ITF World Champions
20th-century French people